Jianghai is a district of Jiangmen City, Guangdong Province, southern China.

Administrative divisions
The Jianghai District is responsible for the administration of three subdistricts:

 Jiaobei Subdistrict & Jiaotou Subdistrict were merged into Jiangnan Subdistrict on 31 July 2015

References

County-level divisions of Guangdong
Jiangmen